USS Challenge (ATA-201) was a Sotoyomo-class auxiliary fleet tug acquired by the United States Navy for service during and after World War II.

Challenge was planned and authorized as Rescue Ocean Tug ATR-128 and was reclassified Auxiliary Fleet Tug ATA-201, 15 May 1944. She was laid down on 3 August 1944 at Gulfport Boiler & Welding Works, Port Arthur, Texas, launched on 23 September 1944, delivered to the Navy on 22 November 1944, commissioned as USS ATA-201 on 15 September 1944.

East Coast activity 
Challenge served on the U.S. East Coast. Very little data is available. However, Navy records indicate she towed  from Green Cove Springs, Florida, to Charleston, South Carolina, in 1947.

Final disposition 
Challenge was decommissioned on 23 December 1947 and struck from the Naval Vessel Register on 1 September 1962. The ship was named USS Challenge (ATA-201) on 16 July 1948. She was sold for scrapping on 1 October 1976 by the Defense Reutilization and Marketing Service, but was resold in 1978 into commercial service. As of 2017, she was operating out of Honduras under the name Saje Commander.

References

External links 
 

Sotoyomo-class tugs
Ships built in Port Arthur, Texas
1944 ships
World War II auxiliary ships of the United States